Get Happy is the sixth studio album from the American musical group Pink Martini. It was released on September 24, 2013 under the band's own label, Heinz Records. Guest artists include Phyllis Diller, Philippe Katerine, Meow Meow, Ari Shapiro, the von Trapps, and Rufus Wainwright.

Composition

Get Happy contains sixteen tracks. "Smile", originally by Charlie Chaplin, serves as the closing track and features American actress and comedian Phyllis Diller (1917–2012).  Pink Martini and Diller recorded the song in January 2012 in her living room in Los Angeles, and the group released it upon her death. In 2014 it was awarded a double silver certification from the Independent Music Companies Association, which indicated sales of at least 40,000 copies throughout Europe.

Track listing
 "Ich dich liebe" (Max Kolpé, Lotar Olias, Karl Vibach), featuring China Forbes
 "Quizás, Quizás, Quizás" (Osvaldo Farrés), featuring Storm Large
 "I'm Waiting for You to Come Back" (Yan Kuan, Chen Ruizhen), featuring Meow Meow
 "Omide zendegani" (Anoushiravan Rohani, Touradj Negahban), featuring Storm Large
 "Yo te quiero siempre" (Ernesto Lecuona), featuring Ari Shapiro
 "Je ne t'aime plus" (Forbes, Katerine), featuring China Forbes and Philippe Katerine
 "Zundoko-Bushi", featuring Timothy Nishimoto
 "Până când nu te iubeam" (Romanian traditional), featuring Storm Large
 "She Was Too Good to Me" (Richard Rodgers, Lorenz Hart), featuring Robert Taylor
 "Üsküdar'a Gider İken" (Turkish traditional), featuring China Forbes
 "Sway" (Pablo Beltrán Ruiz, Norman Gimbel), featuring Storm Large
 "Kitty Come Home" (Anna McGarrigle), featuring Rufus Wainwright with the von Trapps
 "What'll I Do?" (Irving Berlin), featuring China Forbes
 "Get Happy/Happy Days Are Here Again" (Harold Arlen, Ted Koehler/Milton Ager, Jack Yellen), featuring China Forbes and Rufus Wainwright
 "Heliotrope Bouquet" (Scott Joplin, Louis Chauvin) (instrumental)
 "Smile" (Charlie Chaplin, John Turner, Geoffrey Parsons), featuring Phyllis Diller

Chart performance

References

External links
 Official site
 

2013 albums
Heinz Records albums
Pink Martini albums